The Boston Massacre (known in Great Britain as the Incident on King Street) was a confrontation in Boston on March 5, 1770, in which a group of nine British soldiers shot five people of a crowd of three or four hundred who were harassing them verbally and throwing various projectiles. The event was heavily publicized as "a massacre" by leading Patriots such as Paul Revere and Samuel Adams. British troops had been stationed in the Province of Massachusetts Bay since 1768 in order to support crown-appointed officials and to enforce unpopular Parliamentary legislation.

Amid tense relations between the civilians and the soldiers, a mob formed around a British sentry and verbally abused him. He was eventually supported by seven additional soldiers, led by Captain Thomas Preston, who were hit by clubs, stones, and snowballs. Eventually, one soldier fired, prompting the others to fire without an order by Preston. The gunfire instantly killed three people and wounded eight others, two of whom later died of their wounds.

The crowd eventually dispersed after Acting Governor Thomas Hutchinson promised an inquiry, but they re-formed the next day, prompting the withdrawal of the troops to Castle Island. Eight soldiers, one officer, and four civilians were arrested and charged with murder, and they were defended by future U.S. President John Adams. Six of the soldiers were acquitted; the other two were convicted of manslaughter and given reduced sentences. The two found guilty of manslaughter were sentenced to branding on their hand.

Depictions, reports, and propaganda about the event heightened tensions throughout the Thirteen Colonies, notably the colored engraving produced by Paul Revere.

Background

Boston was the capital of the Province of Massachusetts Bay and an important shipping town, and it was also a center of resistance to unpopular acts of taxation by the British Parliament in the 1760s. In 1768, the Townshend Acts were enacted in the Thirteen Colonies putting tariffs on a variety of common items that were manufactured in Britain and imported in the colonies. Colonists objected that the Acts were a violation of the natural, charter, and constitutional rights of British subjects in the colonies. The Massachusetts House of Representatives began a campaign against the Acts by sending a petition to King George III asking for the repeal of the Townshend Revenue Act. The House also sent the Massachusetts Circular Letter to other colonial assemblies, asking them to join the resistance movement, and called for a boycott of merchants importing the affected goods.

Lord Hillsborough had recently been appointed to the newly created office of Colonial Secretary, and he was alarmed by the actions of the Massachusetts House. In April 1768, he sent a letter to the colonial governors in America instructing them to dissolve any colonial assemblies that responded to the Massachusetts Circular Letter. He also ordered Massachusetts Governor Francis Bernard to direct the Massachusetts House to rescind the letter. The house refused to comply.

Boston's chief customs officer Charles Paxton wrote to Hillsborough for military support because "the Government is as much in the hands of the people as it was in the time of the Stamp Act." Commodore Samuel Hood responded by sending the 50-gun warship , which arrived in Boston Harbor in May 1768. On June 10, 1768, customs officials seized Liberty, a sloop owned by leading Boston merchant John Hancock, on allegations that the ship had been involved in smuggling. Bostonians were already angry because the captain of Romney had been impressing local sailors; they began to riot, and customs officials fled to Castle William for protection.

Given the unstable state of affairs in Massachusetts, Hillsborough instructed General Thomas Gage, Commander-in-Chief, North America, to send "such Force as You shall think necessary to Boston", and the first of four British Army regiments began disembarking in Boston on October 1, 1768. Two regiments were removed from Boston in 1769, but the 14th and the 29th Regiments of Foot remained.

The Journal of Occurrences were an anonymous series of newspaper articles which chronicled the clashes between civilians and soldiers in Boston, feeding tensions with its sometimes exaggerated accounts, but those tensions rose markedly after Christopher Seider, "a young lad about eleven Years of Age", was killed by a customs employee on February 22, 1770. Seider's death was covered in the Boston Gazette, and his funeral was described as one of the largest of the time in Boston. The killing and subsequent media coverage inflamed tensions, with groups of colonists looking for soldiers to harass, and soldiers also looking for confrontation.

Incident

On the evening of March 5, Private Hugh White stood on guard duty outside the Boston Custom House on King Street (today known as State Street). A wigmaker's apprentice, approximately 13 years old, named Edward Garrick called out to Captain-Lieutenant John Goldfinch, accusing him of refusing to pay a bill due to Garrick's master. Goldfinch had settled the account the previous day, and ignored the insult. Private White called out to Garrick that he should be more respectful of the officer, and the two men exchanged insults. Garrick then started poking Goldfinch in the chest with his finger; White left his post, challenged the boy, and struck him on the side of the head with his musket. Garrick cried out in pain, and his companion Bartholomew Broaders began to argue with White, which attracted a larger crowd. Henry Knox was a 19-year old bookseller who later served as a general in the revolution; he came upon the scene and warned White that, "if he fired, he must die for it."

As the evening progressed, the crowd around Private White grew larger and more boisterous. Church bells were rung, which usually signified a fire, bringing more people out. More than 50 Bostonians pressed around White, led by a mixed-race former slave named Crispus Attucks, throwing objects at the sentry and challenging him to fire his weapon. White had taken up a somewhat safer position on the steps of the Custom House, and he sought assistance. Runners alerted Captain Thomas Preston, the officer of the watch at the nearby barracks. According to his report, Preston dispatched a non-commissioned officer and six privates from the grenadier company of the 29th Regiment of Foot to relieve White with fixed bayonets. The soldiers were Corporal William Wemms and Privates Hugh Montgomery, John Carroll, William McCauley, William Warren, and Matthew Kilroy, accompanied by Preston. They pushed their way through the crowd. Henry Knox took Preston by the coat and told him, "For God's sake, take care of your men. If they fire, you must die." Captain Preston responded "I am aware of it." When they reached Private White on the custom house stairs, the soldiers loaded their muskets and arrayed themselves in a semicircular formation. Preston shouted at the crowd, estimated between 300 and 400, to disperse.

The crowd continued to press around the soldiers, taunting them by yelling "Fire!", by spitting at them, and by throwing snowballs and other small objects. Innkeeper Richard Palmes was carrying a cudgel, and he came up to Preston and asked if the soldiers' weapons were loaded. Preston assured him that they were, but that they would not fire unless he ordered it; he later stated in his deposition that he was unlikely to do so, since he was standing in front of them. A thrown object then struck Private Montgomery, knocking him down and causing him to drop his musket. He recovered his weapon and angrily shouted "Damn you, fire!", then discharged it into the crowd although no command was given. Palmes swung his cudgel first at Montgomery, hitting his arm, and then at Preston. He narrowly missed Preston's head, striking him on the arm instead.

There was a pause of uncertain length (eyewitness estimates ranged from several seconds to two minutes), after which the soldiers fired into the crowd. It was not a disciplined volley, since Preston gave no orders to fire; the soldiers fired a ragged series of shots which hit 11 men. Three Americans died instantly: rope maker Samuel Gray, mariner James Caldwell, and Crispus Attucks. Samuel Maverick, a 17-year old apprentice ivory turner, was struck by a ricocheting musket ball at the back of the crowd and died early the next morning. Irish immigrant Patrick Carr was shot in the abdomen, an inevitably fatal wound at that time, and died two weeks later. Apprentice Christopher Monk was seriously wounded; he was crippled and died in 1780, purportedly due to the injuries that he had sustained in the attack a decade earlier.

The crowd moved away from the immediate area of the custom house but continued to grow in nearby streets. Captain Preston immediately called out most of the 29th Regiment, which adopted defensive positions in front of the state house. Acting Governor Thomas Hutchinson was summoned to the scene and was forced by the movement of the crowd into the council chamber of the state house. From its balcony, he was able to minimally restore order, promising that there would be a fair inquiry into the shootings if the crowd dispersed.

Aftermath

Investigation
Hutchinson immediately began investigating the affair, and Preston and the eight soldiers were arrested by the next morning. Boston's selectmen then asked him to order the troops to move from the city out to Castle William on Castle Island, while colonists held a town meeting at Faneuil Hall to discuss the affair. The governor's council was initially opposed to ordering the troop withdrawal, and Hutchinson explained he did not have the authority to order the troops to move. Lieutenant Colonel William Dalrymple was the commander of the troops, and he did not offer to move them. The town meeting became more restive when it learned of this; the council changed its position and unanimously ("under duress", according to Hutchinson's report) agreed to request the troops' removal. Secretary of State Andrew Oliver reported that, had the troops not been removed, "they would probably be destroyed by the people—should it be called rebellion, should it incur the loss of our charter, or be the consequence what it would." The 14th was transferred to Castle Island without incident about a week later, with the 29th following shortly after, leaving the governor without effective means to police the town. The first four victims were buried with ceremony on March 8 in the Granary Burying Ground, one of Boston's oldest burial grounds. Patrick Carr, the fifth and final victim, died on March 14 and was buried with them on March 17.

On March 27, the eight soldiers, Captain Preston, and four civilians were indicted for murder; the civilians were in the Customs House and were alleged to have fired shots. Bostonians continued to be hostile to the troops and their dependents. General Gage was convinced that the troops were doing more harm than good, so he ordered the 29th Regiment out of the province in May. Governor Hutchinson took advantage of the on-going high tensions to orchestrate delays of the trials until later in the year.

Media battle
In the days and weeks following the incident, a propaganda battle was waged between Boston's Patriots and Loyalists. Both sides published pamphlets that told strikingly different stories, which were principally published in London in a bid to influence opinion there. The Boston Gazette version of events, for example, characterized the massacre as part of an ongoing scheme to "quell a Spirit of Liberty", and harped on the negative consequences of quartering troops in the city.

Henry Pelham was an engraver and half-brother of celebrated portrait painter John Singleton Copley, and he depicted the event in an engraving. Silversmith and engraver Paul Revere closely copied the image and is often credited as its originator. The engraving contained several inflammatory details. Captain Preston is shown ordering his men to fire, and a musket is seen shooting out of the window of the customs office, which is labeled "Butcher's Hall". Artist Christian Remick hand-colored some prints. Some copies of the print show a man with two chest wounds and a somewhat darker face, matching descriptions of Attucks; others show no black victim. The image was published in the Boston Gazette and circulated widely, and it became an effective anti-British editorial. The image of bright red "lobster backs" and wounded men with red blood was hung in farmhouses throughout New England.

Anonymous pamphlets were published describing the event from significantly different perspectives. A Short Narrative of the Horrid Massacre was published under the auspices of the Boston town meeting, principally written by James Bowdoin, a member of the governor's council and a vocal opponent of British colonial policy, along with Samuel Pemberton and Joseph Warren. It described the shooting and other lesser incidents that took place in the days before as unprovoked attacks on peaceful, law-abiding inhabitants and, according to historian Neal Langley York, was probably the most influential description of the event. The account which it provided was drawn from more than 90 depositions taken after the event, and it included accusations that the soldiers sent by Captain Preston had been deployed with the intention of causing harm. In the interest of minimizing impact on the jury pool, city leaders held back local distribution of the pamphlet, but they sent copies to other colonies and to London, where they knew that depositions were headed which Governor Hutchinson had collected. A second pamphlet entitled Additional Observations on the Short Narrative furthered the attack on crown officials by complaining that customs officials were abandoning their posts under the pretense that it was too dangerous for them to do their duties; one customs official had left Boston to carry Hutchinson's gathered depositions to London.

Hutchinson's depositions were eventually published in a pamphlet entitled A Fair Account of the Late Unhappy Disturbance in Boston, drawn mainly from the depositions of soldiers. Its account of affairs sought to blame Bostonians for denying the validity of Parliamentary laws. It also blamed the city's citizens for the lawlessness preceding the event, and claimed that they set up an ambush of the soldiers. As it was not published until well after the first pamphlet had arrived in London, it had a much smaller impact on the public debate there.

Trials

The government was determined to give the soldiers a fair trial so that there could be no grounds for retaliation from the British and so that moderates would not be alienated from the Patriot cause. Several lawyers refused to defend Preston due to their Loyalist leanings, so he sent a request to John Adams, pleading for him to work on the case. Adams was already a leading Patriot and was contemplating a run for public office, but  he agreed to help in the interest of ensuring a fair trial. He was joined by Josiah Quincy II after Quincy was assured that the Sons of Liberty would not oppose his appointment, and by Loyalist Robert Auchmuty. They were assisted by Sampson Salter Blowers, whose chief duty was to investigate the jury pool, and by Paul Revere, who drew a detailed map of the bodies to be used in the trial. Massachusetts Solicitor General Samuel Quincy and private attorney Robert Treat Paine were hired by the town of Boston to handle the prosecution. Preston was tried separately in late October 1770. He was acquitted after the jury was convinced that he had not ordered the troops to fire.

The trial of the eight soldiers opened on November 27, 1770. Adams told the jury to look beyond the fact that the soldiers were British. He referred to the crowd that had provoked the soldiers as "a motley rabble of saucy boys, negroes, and molattoes, Irish teagues and outlandish Jack Tarrs" (sailors). He then stated, "And why we should scruple to call such a set of people a mob, I can't conceive, unless the name is too respectable for them. The sun is not about to stand still or go out, nor the rivers to dry up because there was a mob in Boston on the 5th of March that attacked a party of soldiers."

Adams also described the former slave Crispus Attucks, saying "his very look was enough to terrify any person" and that "with one hand [he] took hold of a bayonet, and with the other knocked the man down." Adams stated that it was Attucks' behavior that, "in all probability, the dreadful carnage of that night is chiefly to be ascribed." He argued that the soldiers had the legal right to fight back against the mob and so were innocent. If they were provoked but not endangered, he argued, they were at most guilty of manslaughter. Farah Peterson, of The American Scholar, states that Adams' speeches during the trial show that his strategy "was to convince the jury that his clients had only killed a black man and his cronies, and that they didn't deserve to hang for it."

The jury agreed with Adams' arguments and acquitted six of the soldiers after 2 hours of deliberation. Two of the soldiers were found guilty of manslaughter because there was overwhelming evidence that they had fired directly into the crowd. The jury's decisions suggest that they believed that the soldiers had felt threatened by the crowd but should have delayed firing. The convicted soldiers were granted reduced sentences by pleading benefit of clergy, which reduced their punishment from a death sentence to branding of the thumb in open court.

Patrick Carr's deathbed account of the event also played a role in exonerating the eight defendants of murder charges. The testimony of John Jeffries is reprinted below:

Justices Edmund Trowbridge and Peter Oliver instructed the jury, and Oliver specifically addressed Carr's testimony: "this Carr was not upon oath, it is true, but you will determine whether a man just stepping into eternity is not to be believed, especially in favor of a set of men by whom he had lost his life". Carr's testimony is one of the earliest recorded uses of the dying declaration exception to the inadmissibility of hearsay evidence in United States legal code.

The four civilians were tried on December 13. The principal prosecution witness was a servant of one of the accused who made claims that were easily rebutted by defense witnesses. They were all acquitted, and the servant was eventually convicted of perjury, whipped, and banished from the province.

Legacy

Contribution to American Revolution

The Boston Massacre is considered one of the most significant events that turned colonial sentiment against King George III and British Parliamentary authority. John Adams wrote that the "foundation of American independence was laid" on March 5, 1770, and Samuel Adams and other Patriots used annual commemorations (Massacre Day) to encourage public sentiment toward independence. Christopher Monk was the boy who was wounded in the attack and died in 1780, and his memory was honored as a reminder of British hostility.

Later events such as the Gaspee Affair and the Boston Tea Party further illustrated the crumbling relationship between Britain and its colonies. Five years passed between the massacre and outright war, and Neil York suggests that there is only a tenuous connection between the two. It is widely perceived as a significant event leading to the violent rebellion that followed. Howard Zinn argues that Boston was full of "class anger". He reports that the Boston Gazette published in 1763 that "a few persons in power" were promoting political projects "for keeping the people poor in order to make them humble."

Commemorations

The massacre was remembered in 1858 in a celebration organized by William Cooper Nell, a black abolitionist who saw the death of Crispus Attucks as an opportunity to demonstrate the role of African Americans in the Revolutionary War. Artwork was produced commemorating the massacre, changing the color of a victim's skin to black to emphasize Attucks' death. In 1888, the Boston Massacre Monument was erected on the Boston Common in memory of the men killed in the massacre, and the five victims were reinterred in a prominent grave in the Granary Burying Ground.

The massacre is reenacted annually on March 5 under the auspices of the Bostonian Society. The Old State House, the massacre site, and the Granary Burying Ground are part of Boston's Freedom Trail, connecting sites important in the city's history.

See also

 List of massacres in the United States
Timeline of United States revolutionary history (1760–1789)

References

Sources
   Original printing of a reply to "A Short Narrative…", supplying several depositions, including that of Lieutenant-Governor Hutchinson, which were left out of the Narrative.
  Original printing of the report of a committee of the town of Boston.

Further reading

External links

 
 The Boston Massacre Historical Society
 Boston National Historical Park Official Website
 Adams’ Argument for the Defense at the trial of the soldiers, at Founders Online website. (Retrieved 10 December 2017.)
 Massachusetts Historical Society Massacre Exhibit
 Boston Massacre investigative game by the Bostonian Society, stagers of the annual reenactment

 
1770 crimes in North America
1770 in the Thirteen Colonies
1770 riots
American Revolution
Conflicts in 1770
Massacres in 1770
Financial District, Boston
Disasters in Boston
Massacres committed by Great Britain
Massacres in the Thirteen Colonies
Massachusetts in the American Revolution
18th century in Boston
1770 in Massachusetts
Massacres in the American Revolutionary War